Wolffe is a surname. Notable people with the surname include:

 Alan Wolffe (1959–2001), British cell biologist
 Jabez Wolffe (1876–1943), British swimmer who attempted to swim the English Channel many times
 James Wolffe (born 1962), Scottish lawyer
 Richard Wolffe (born 1968), British-American journalist, MSNBC commentator and author

See also
 Eva de Wolffe, a character in the UK TV series Footballers' Wives
 Commander Wolffe, the clone CC-3636 who was the leader of the Wolfpack
 Wolf
 Wolfe (disambiguation)
 Wolff
 Woolf

Surnames from given names